Sandoricum vidalii is a species of plant in the family Meliaceae. It is endemic to the Philippines.  It is threatened by habitat loss.

References

Flora of the Philippines
vidalii
Vulnerable plants
Taxonomy articles created by Polbot